Anton Dale Robinson (born 17 February 1986 in Harrow, London) is an English retired professional footballer who played as a central midfielder, for a number of clubs, most notably AFC Bournemouth and Huddersfield Town, before retiring from professional football due to a serious knee injury.

Club career

Early career
Robinson started his career with Millwall, and was captain of the youth team. He featured for Millwall in the League Championship and the FA Cup. Robinson was also part of the Millwall squad that reached the FA Cup final in 2004.

In 2006, he moved to Exeter City but was not offered the opportunity to showcase his talent. He then signed a contract for Fisher Athletic in 2006 and made 18 appearances scoring six goals. In 2007, Robinson then signed with Weymouth, eventually becoming the captain. He made 85 appearances and scored 10 goals.

Bournemouth
After a string of fine displays for Weymouth, Robinson signed for Football League club AFC Bournemouth in January 2009. He scored his first goal for Bournemouth in a match against Chester City away on 18 April 2009. Bournemouth won the match 2–0.

Huddersfield Town
After a previous offer had been turned down, Huddersfield Town signed Robinson on a three-year contract on 1 August 2011, paying an  undisclosed transfer fee. He made his Terriers debut in the 1–1 draw against Bury at the Galpharm Stadium on 6 August 2011, but suffered a hamstring injury during the first half. His first goal for the club was the only goal in a 1–0 win against Yeovil Town at Huish Park on 29 October 2011.
Robinson made a total of 30 first team appearances for Huddersfield in his first season at the club, making 12 starts among 26 league appearances as Huddersfield won promotion through the play-offs.

The following season, he made just one league appearance for Huddersfield, in a 3–0 defeat against Middlesbrough in November, before joining League Two leaders Gillingham on loan from 31 January 2013 for the remainder of the season. He played 14 games for the club, but his loan was cut short on 11 April, after he ruptured his anterior cruciate ligaments, ruling him out of action for nine months.

On 24 March 2014, Robinson joined League One side Coventry City for the remainder of the 2013–14 season.  He was released by Huddersfield when his loan expired in May 2014.

International career
Robinson has represented his country at international level having represented England on two occasions at semi-pro level with the England C team. Robinson's impressive performances as Weymouth captain earned him a call-up to the England squad for their friendly away at Bosnia & Herzegovina B in September 2008, where the match ended in a 6–2. He was then named on the team to face the Italy Lega Pro side in an International Challenge Trophy game. The match ended in a draw with the score line at 2–2 in November 2008.

Career statistics

Honours
AFC Bournemouth:
Football League Two Runners up: 2009–10
Huddersfield Town:
Football League One play-off winner: 2011–12

References

External links

Profile at Margate F.C.

English footballers
1986 births
Living people
Millwall F.C. players
Eastleigh F.C. players
Margate F.C. players
Exeter City F.C. players
Eastbourne Borough F.C. players
Fisher Athletic F.C. players
Grays Athletic F.C. players
Weymouth F.C. players
AFC Bournemouth players
Huddersfield Town A.F.C. players
Gillingham F.C. players
Coventry City F.C. players
English Football League players
National League (English football) players
Isthmian League players
England semi-pro international footballers
Footballers from Harrow, London
Association football midfielders